InSoc Recombinant is a compilation album of the greatest hits by the synthpop band Information Society, in various remixed versions. It includes, as a bonus, a CD-ROM with five music videos.

Track listing
 "What's on Your Mind (Pure Energy) (CKB Remix)" - 4:48
 "Closing In (Rosetta Stone Mix)" - 4:59
 "Peace & Love, Inc. (Biokraft Mix)" - 4:59
 "Think (Spahn Ranch Mix)" - 4:58
 "What's on Your Mind? (Pure Energy) (Girl Eats Boy Mix)" - 4:59
 "Walking Away (Leæther Strip Mix)" - 4:59
 "Going Going Gone (Razed in Black Mix)" - 4:56
 "What's on Your Mind? (Pure Energy) (Judson Leach and the Exhibition Mix)" - 4:51
 "Empty (Astralasia Mix)" - 4:59
 "Ending World (Electric Hellfire Club Mix)" - 4:48
 "On the Outside (THC Mix)" - 4:15
 "What's on Your Mind? (Pure Energy) (David J Remix)" - 4:50

 The Brazilian release included InSoc's cover of Madonna's "'Express Yourself" (previously released in the compilation Virgin Voices: A Tribute To Madonna). 
 All the remixes of "What's On Your Mind? (Pure Energy)" were released on a 12" single the year before.

Video listing
 "What's on Your Mind (Pure Energy)"
 "Walking Away"
 "Repetition"
 "Think"
 "Peace & Love, Inc"

Information Society (band) albums
1999 remix albums